The Federation of Enterprise Architecture Professional Organizations (FEAPO) is a worldwide association of professional organizations which have come together to provide a forum to standardize, professionalize, and otherwise advance the discipline of Enterprise Architecture.

The current members of the FEAPO are:
 Association for Enterprise Information
 Australian Computer Society
 Business Architecture Guild
 Business Architecture Society
 Canadian Information Processing Society
 Center for Advancement for the Enterprise Architecture Profession
 Data Management International (DAMA International)
 DAMA International Education & Research Foundation
 Global IT Community Association
 IEEE Computer Society
 Industry Advisory Council (Enterprise Architecture Shared Interest Group)
 Institute of Information Technology Professionals New Zealand 
 International Council on Systems Engineering
 International Federation for Information Processing
 International Institute of Business Analysis
 National Association of State Chief Information Officers
 Network Professional Association
 Netherlands Architecture Forum

Publications 
 Common Perspectives on Enterprise Architecture - This paper describes the field of enterprise architecture and the value that the enterprise architecture function brings to an organization. The focus of this paper is to provide a unified perspective of enterprise architecture to a wide-ranging audience, not just to the architects themselves, but also to the people who interact with the architects, and others who want to learn about enterprise architecture.

References

External links 
 FEAPO

Enterprise architecture
Business and finance professional associations
Computer network organizations